Dianthus arenarius, the sand pink, is a species of Dianthus typically found on the shores of the Baltic Sea, although there are populations elsewhere in colder areas of Europe where there are sandy soils. The unimproved species, and at least one cultivar, 'Little Maiden', are available from commercial suppliers.

Subspecies

A number of subspecies have been described:

Dianthus arenarius subsp. arenarius 
Dianthus arenarius subsp. bohemicus (Novák) O. Schwarz
Dianthus arenarius subsp. borussicus Vierh.
Dianthus arenarius subsp. pseudoserotinus (Blocki) Tutin
Dianthus arenarius subsp. pseudosquarrosus (Novák) Kleopow

References

arenarius
Flora of Europe
Garden plants of Europe
Plants described in 1753
Taxa named by Carl Linnaeus